Sofya Lansere was the defending champion but lost in the first round to Eva Lys.

Katie Swan won the title, defeating Wang Xinyu in the final, 6–1, 3–6, 6–4.

Seeds

Draw

Finals

Top half

Bottom half

References

External Links
Main Draw

Empire Women's Indoor 1 - Singles